Anneta Kyridou (born 30 October 1998) is a Greek rower from Thessaloniki. She competed in the 2020 Summer Olympics, taking the 10th place. She is the sister of Maria Kyridou.

References

1998 births
Living people
Rowers from Thessaloniki
Rowers at the 2020 Summer Olympics
Greek female rowers
Olympic rowers of Greece
European Rowing Championships medalists